Sally Scott (born 12 April 1991) is a British track and field athlete. She competed for England in the Pole vault event at the 2014 Commonwealth Games where she won a bronze medal.she played hockey in the olympic games and won a gold medal.

References 

1991 births
Living people
English female pole vaulters
Commonwealth Games bronze medallists for England
Athletes (track and field) at the 2014 Commonwealth Games
Commonwealth Games medallists in athletics
Medallists at the 2014 Commonwealth Games